The non-squeezing theorem, also called Gromov's non-squeezing theorem, is one of the most important theorems in symplectic geometry.  It was first proven in 1985 by Mikhail Gromov. 
The theorem states that one cannot embed a ball into a cylinder via a symplectic map unless the radius of the ball is less than or equal to the radius of the cylinder.  The theorem is important because formerly very little was known about the geometry behind symplectic maps.

One easy consequence of a transformation being symplectic is that it preserves volume. One can easily embed a ball of any radius into a cylinder of any other radius by a volume-preserving transformation: just picture squeezing the ball into the cylinder (hence, the name non-squeezing theorem). Thus, the non-squeezing theorem tells us that, although symplectic transformations are volume-preserving, it is much more restrictive for a transformation to be symplectic than it is to be volume-preserving.

Background and statement 
We start by considering the symplectic spaces

 

the ball of radius R:  

and the cylinder of radius r:  

each endowed with the symplectic form

 

The non-squeezing theorem tells us that if we can find a symplectic embedding φ : B(R) → Z(r) then R ≤ r.

The “symplectic camel” 
Gromov's non-squeezing theorem has also become known as the principle of the symplectic camel since Ian Stewart referred to it by alluding to the parable of the camel and the eye of a needle. As Maurice A. de Gosson states:

Similarly: 

De Gosson has shown that the non-squeezing theorem is closely linked to the Robertson–Schrödinger–Heisenberg inequality, a generalization of the Heisenberg uncertainty relation. The Robertson–Schrödinger–Heisenberg inequality states that:

with Q and P the canonical coordinates and var and cov the variance and covariance functions.

References

Further reading 
 Maurice A. de Gosson: The symplectic egg, arXiv:1208.5969v1, submitted on 29 August 2012 – includes a proof of a variant of the theorem for case of linear canonical transformations
 Dusa McDuff: What is symplectic geometry?, 2009

Symplectic geometry
Theorems in geometry